Vyacheslav Viktorovich Chanov (born 23 October 1951) is a Russian football coach and a former goalkeeper.

International career
Chanov played his only game for USSR on 28 March 1984 in a friendly against West Germany, and he was the team captain in that game. He was included in Soviet 1982 FIFA World Cup squad, but did not play in any games.

Personal life
He is the brother of fellow football goalkeeper Viktor Chanov.

Honours

Individual
 Goalkeeper of the Year: 1981.

External links
 Profile in Russian

1951 births
Footballers from Moscow
Living people
Vyacheslav
Association football goalkeepers
Soviet footballers
Soviet expatriate footballers
Soviet Union international footballers
Ukrainian footballers
Russian footballers
Russian expatriate footballers
Expatriate footballers in East Germany
Expatriate footballers in Germany
1982 FIFA World Cup players
FC Shakhtar Donetsk players
FC Torpedo Moscow players
PFC CSKA Moscow players
Eisenhüttenstädter FC Stahl players
Russian football managers
FSV Optik Rathenow players
Neftçi PFK players